Pescadero Creek is a  southward-flowing stream originating in the southern Santa Cruz Mountains. It begins in Santa Clara County, California and flows into Santa Cruz County, before joining the Pajaro River, and thence to Monterey Bay and the Pacific Ocean. Pescadero Creek is the center of a critical linkage connecting the wildlife of the southern Santa Cruz Mountains to the Gabilan Range to the south.

History
"Pescadero" is Spanish for "fishing place". In 1861 Manuel Larios testified in the Rancho Las Animas land grant case that "the Castros had an Indian boy who went to this creek to fish". Then John Gilroy testified "the Pescadero draws its name from the fact of our catching salmon there" and "the Castros, I, and an Indian gave it that name in 1814, being a place where we used to catch salmon." Arroyo de Pescadero is shown on diseños from the 1830s.

Watershed and Course 

Ecology and Conservation 
Pescadero Creek hosts spawning runs of anadromous steelhead trout (Oncorhynchus mykiss).

The  Star Creek Ranch on the eastern slope of Mount Atherton has been protected by the Land Trust of Santa Cruz County. It is a component of a critical linkage for wildlife to move from the Santa Cruz Mountains to the Gabilan Range to the south.

An analysis of Landsat satellite images in Santa Clara County, California (SCC) showed that  of forests and woodlands were highly disturbed in SCC between 1999 and 2009, 37% (34 km2) of which did not overlap with any known wildland fire boundaries, and hence, were confirmed to be lost to new residential or commercial development activities. These included large patches of forest cover lost to roads for new residential developments in the Star Creek drainage and east of Atherton Peak in the Pajaro Hills of southern SCC.

References

External links
 Pajaro River Watershed Flood Prevention Authority
 Coastal Habitat Education Environment and Restoration (CHEER) - an Upper Pajaro River Watershed group
  Pajaro Watershed Web Portal

Rivers of Santa Clara County, California
Rivers of Santa Cruz County, California
Santa Cruz Mountains
Rivers of the San Francisco Bay Area
Rivers of Northern California